The 1995 Junior World Sports Acrobatics Championships was the fourth edition of the acrobatic gymnastics competition, then named sports acrobatics, and took place in Riesa, Germany, from May 27 to 28, 1995. The competition was organized by the International Federation of Sports Acrobatics (IFSA).

Medal summary

Results

References

Junior World Acrobatic Gymnastics Championships
Junior World Acrobatic Gymnastics Championships
International gymnastics competitions hosted by Germany
Junior World Gymnastics Championships